Heikki Kalervo Hykkäälä (16 August 1914, in Valkeala – 1 August 1995) was a Finnish civil servant and politician.  He was a member of the Parliament of Finland from 1948 to 1958 and again from 1966 to 1975, representing the Social Democratic Party of Finland (SDP).

References

1914 births
1995 deaths
People from Valkeala
People from Viipuri Province (Grand Duchy of Finland)
Social Democratic Party of Finland politicians
Members of the Parliament of Finland (1948–51)
Members of the Parliament of Finland (1951–54)
Members of the Parliament of Finland (1954–58)
Members of the Parliament of Finland (1966–70)
Members of the Parliament of Finland (1970–72)
Members of the Parliament of Finland (1972–75)